Leader of the Banned is the third Sam Kinison comedy album released in 1990. The first side consists of stand-up comedy, and the second side consists of covers of classic rock songs by bands such as AC/DC, Mountain, Cheap Trick, and The Rolling Stones.

Track listing

Musicians
Credits from Allmusic.
Jimmy Bain - bass
Michael Baird - drums
David Bryan - piano
Kim Bullard - keyboards, background vocals
Tony Clark-Stewart - bagpipes
Lanny Cordola - guitar, background vocals
Jody Cortez - drums
Fred Coury - drums
David Cumming - background vocals
C.C. DeVille - guitar
Gary Falcone - background vocals
Michael Fiore - background vocals
Tommy Funderburk - background vocals
Robert Irving - background vocals
Randy Jackson - bass
Bobby Leigh - background vocals
Vinnie Ludovico - drums
Eddie Money - background vocals
Joe Pizzulo - background vocals
Robert Sarzo - guitar
Rudy Sarzo - bass
Slash - guitar
Billy Trudell - background vocals
Leslie West - bass, guitar
Harald Wiik - background vocals
Swerre Wiik - background vocals
Richie Wise - background vocals
Chuck Wright - background vocals
Dweezil Zappa - guitar
Richie Zito - background vocals, producer

References

1990 live albums
Sam Kinison albums
Warner Records albums
1990s comedy albums
Glam metal albums